Simon Cox (born 23 March 1984) is an English former football goalkeeper.

He attended ADT College (now Ashcroft Technology Academy) when he was a teenager.

Cox started his career with Reading F.C. and joined to Oxford United in 2002. He was released in 2005, and has since been without a club.

References

External links

1984 births
Living people
Footballers from Clapham
English footballers
Association football goalkeepers
Oxford United F.C. players
English people of Irish descent